Gianfranco Gaspari (born 5 August 1938) is an Italian bobsledder who competed from the late 1960s to the early 1970s. He won four medals at the FIBT World Championships with one gold (two-man: 1971), two silvers (two-man: 1966, four-man: 1969), and one bronze (two-man: 1969).

Gaspari finished 21 seconds behind fellow Italian bobsledder Eugenio Monti in the two-man event at the 1966 FIBT World Championships in Cortina d'Ampezzo.

Competing in two Winter Olympics, his best finish was fourth in the two-man event at Sapporo in 1972.

References
Bobsleigh two-man world championship medalists since 1931
Bobsleigh four-man world championship medalists since 1930
"Bobsledding: Just Short of Disaster". Time. 11 February 1966.
Wallechinsky, David (1984). "Bobsled". In The Complete Book of the Olympics: 1896 - 1980. New York: Penguin Books. pp. 559, 561.

Bobsledders at the 1968 Winter Olympics
Bobsledders at the 1972 Winter Olympics
Italian male bobsledders
Living people
1938 births
Olympic bobsledders of Italy